Girnitz is a river of Bavaria, Germany. It flows into the Floß in Störnstein.

See also
List of rivers of Bavaria

References

Rivers of Bavaria
Rivers of the Upper Palatine Forest
Rivers of Germany